North Avenue is an underground train station in southern Midtown Atlanta, GA, serving the Red and Gold lines of the Metropolitan Atlanta Rapid Transit Authority (MARTA) rail system. Named after the nearby North Avenue. The walls are made of white tile and painted with a mural of green hills, a blue sky, and clouds. The murals were designed by Gordon Anderson while he was a Professor of Art at Georgia State University. It is among the busiest stations in the system with an average of 15,000 boardings per weekday. The station has a direct entrance to the AT&T Midtown Center and is actually located in the skyscraper's basement.

It provides access to the Baltimore Block, Bank of America Plaza, Center for the Visually Impaired,  Bobby Dodd Stadium, Emory University Hospital Midtown, Georgia Institute of Technology, Shakespeare Tavern, The Varsity, Rufus M. Rose House, The Fox Theatre, and the Georgian Terrace Hotel. It also provides connecting bus service to The Carter Center, the communities of Edgewood and Inman Park, Fulton County Sheriffs Headquarters and Jail, Coca-Cola headquarters, Bauder College, Fernbank Museum of Natural History, Piedmont Park and Ferst Center for the Arts.

Station layout

Bus routes
The station is served by the following MARTA bus routes:
 Route 2 - Ponce De Leon Avenue / Druid Hills
 Route 50 - Donald Lee Hollowell Parkway
 Route 51 - Joseph E. Boone Boulevard
 Route 102 - North Avenue / Little Five Points
 Route 899 - Old Fourth Ward

Connection to other transit systems
 CobbLinc
 Ride Gwinnett
 Georgia Regional Transportation Authority

References

External links

 MARTA Station Page
 nycsubway.org Atlanta page
 Ponce de Leon Avenue entrance from Google Maps Street View
 North Avenue entrance from Google Maps Street View

Gold Line (MARTA)
Red Line (MARTA)
Metropolitan Atlanta Rapid Transit Authority stations
Railway stations in the United States opened in 1981
Railway stations in Atlanta
1981 establishments in Georgia (U.S. state)